The Plains of Passage is an historical fiction novel by Jean M. Auel published in 1990.  It is the sequel to The Mammoth Hunters and fourth in the Earth's Children series.

Plot 

The Plains of Passage describes the journey of  Ayla and Jondalar west along the Great Mother River (the Danube), from the home of The Mammoth Hunters (roughly modern Ukraine) to Jondalar's homeland (close to Les Eyzies, Dordogne, France). During this journey, Ayla meets the various peoples who live along their line of march. These meetings, the attitudes and beliefs of these groups, and Ayla's response form an essential part of the story.

Characters range in description from innocent to bloodthirsty, from serious to comical, from noble to corrupt, from found to lost, and from peaceful to violent. All of these adjectives apply in some way to either Jondalar or Ayla. Ayla (and to some extent Jondalar) is often viewed by her new friends as mystic or supernatural, partially due to her friendships with the world's first known domesticated horses and wolf, but also due to her generous nature and wisdom.

As they encounter people Jondalar and his brother met on their journey eastward they have a hard time leaving them, especially after an offer to become joined with a high-ranking Sharamudoi couple.  Jondalar declines the offer, giving as excuse his desire to have the lead mystic of his people search for and help his deceased brother cross over to the other side.

It concludes with Ayla and Jondalar's successful return to the Zelandoni, and Ayla's stated pregnancy, and Whinney's definite pregnancy.

The Plains of Passage is one of the longer books in the Earth's Children series.  It was followed by The Shelters of Stone.

Critical response
Entertainment Weekly gave the novel a B+ upon its release in 1990, saying it has a "low-intensity fascination [similar to] an actual hike through the wilderness". Entertainment Weekly also claims "Auel's main strength is melodrama that has been enlisted in the service of a serious, improving message that a lot of people want to receive. In Auel's case the didactic component is a postfeminist allegory that validates Woman's new place in society, with one foot in the (hunting/ gathering) workplace and the other still solidly planted on the domestic hearth". Auel is often praised for her knowledge on the Paleolithic, and this chapter in the Earth's Children series is no exception.

Public Response
"The Plains of Passage" spent weeks on the New York Times best sellers list from 1990–1991. The novel currently holds a 3.7/5 on Goodreads  and a 4.5/5 on the Barnes and Noble website. Many readers found this book to have tedious details and meticulous information, but was enjoyable overall.

References

External links
 
 http://www.ew.com/ew/article/0,,318279,00.html
 https://www.nytimes.com/1991/02/03/books/best-sellers-february-3-1991.html
 https://www.nytimes.com/1991/05/05/books/best-sellers-may-5-1991.html
 http://www.barnesandnoble.com/w/plains-of-passage-jean-m-auel/1100290177?ean=9780553289411
 http://www.goodreads.com/book/show/74389.The_Plains_of_Passage

Earth's Children
1990 American novels